Pedro Miguel Miranda Soeíro (born 11 September 1975) is a Portuguese professional road cyclist. Professional from 1995 to 2010, he most notably won the Portuguese National Road Race Championships in 2003.

Major results

1999
 1st Stage 3 
2000
 1st Stage 3 Volta ao Alentejo
2003
 1st  Road race, National Road Championships
 1st Porto–Lisboa
 1st Stage 1 GP Cantanhede
2004
 1st Overall 
1st Stages 1 & 2
 1st Porto–Lisboa
 1st GP Area Metropolitana de Vigo
 5th Road race, National Road Championships
 7th Overall GP CTT Correios de Portugal
 9th Overall Volta ao Alentejo
 10th Overall Tour du Poitou Charentes
2005
 2nd Overall Volta ao Alentejo
1st Points classification
1st Stage 1
 1st Stage 3 Volta de Ciclismo Internacional do Estado de São Paulo
 4th Road race, National Road Championships
2006
 1st Stage 3 Volta de Ciclismo Internacional do Estado de São Paulo
 6th Overall GP Costa Azul

References

External links

1975 births
Living people
Portuguese male cyclists
Sportspeople from Matosinhos